Letnitsa (also transliterated Letnitza, Letnica) is a town in central northern Bulgaria, part of Lovech Province. It is the administrative centre of the homonymous Letnitsa Municipality and lies in the northeastern part of the province, close to the town of Levski. As of December 2009, the town has a population of 3,739 inhabitants.

Economy

Several export-focused manufacturers are based or have factories in Letnitsa. As of 2019, exports as a share of the municipality's total production are the second-highest in Bulgaria. The town has among the highest average wages in Bulgaria. Among the largest employers and exporters in the town is Walltopia, which opened its climbing wall manufacturing facility in the town in 2010 and has since expanded it multiple times. 

Other companies in Letnitsa are mostly in the food and agriculture industries, the largest of which is frozen foods producer Bulgaria Foods.

Municipality
Letnitsa municipality includes the following four places:

 Gorsko Slivovo
 Karpachevo
 Krushuna
 Letnitsa

Honour
Letnitsa Glacier on Smith Island, South Shetland Islands is named after Letnitsa.

References

Populated places in Lovech Province
Towns in Bulgaria